The 2012 United States elections took place on November 6, 2012. Democratic President Barack Obama won reelection to a second term and the Democrats gained seats in both chambers of Congress, retaining control of the Senate even though the Republican Party retained control of the House of Representatives. As of 2022, this is the most recent election cycle in which neither the presidency nor a chamber of Congress changed partisan control, and the last time that the winner of the presidential race provided coattails for their party in both the House of Representatives and the Senate.

Obama defeated Republican nominee Mitt Romney to win a second term, taking 51.1 percent of the popular vote and 332 of the 538 electoral votes. Romney defeated Rick Santorum, Newt Gingrich, and several other candidates to win his party's nomination in the 2012 Republican primaries.

Democrats won a net gain of two Senate seats, retaining control of the chamber. In the first election held in the House of Representatives since the round of redistricting following the 2010 United States census, Democrats picked up eight seats but failed to gain a majority, despite winning the popular vote. In the gubernatorial elections, Republicans won a net gain of one seat. This was the first time since 1936 that a Democratic presidential candidate who won a second term also had Senate coattails in both occasions (although Franklin Roosevelt won a third and fourth term in 1940 and 1944 respectively, he lost Senate seats on both occasions). This is the third straight presidential election where the winner had coattails in both houses of Congress.

Various other state, territorial, and local races and referendums were held throughout the year. Three state referendums passed legalizing same-sex marriage, while Minnesota became the first state in history to reject a proposed state-level constitutional ban of same sex marriage. Two states approved and one rejected the legalization of recreational marijuana, and one more state voted to legalize marijuana for medical use. A referendum was also held in Puerto Rico regarding the future political status of the U.S. unincorporated territory. Following the Supreme Court's Citizens United decision, the 2012 election season became the most expensive in American history.

Issues
Despite various issues during this election cycle, ultimately little overall change occurred on both the Federal and the gubernatorial levels.

Unresolved issues from 2008 and 2010
Many of the major issues of the 2012 election were the same as in both 2008 and 2010. Candidates and voters in 2012 were again focused on national economic conditions and jobs, record federal deficits, health care and the effects of the controversial Affordable Care Act, national security and terrorism, education, and energy.

Immigration reform and the controversial Arizona Senate Bill 1070, passed by the state in 2010 to enhance the power of Arizona's law enforcement agencies to investigate the immigration status of suspected illegal immigrants, also remained important issues. On June 25, 2012, the Supreme Court delivered its decision in Arizona v. United States, striking down three of the four provisions of Arizona's law.

Wisconsin collective bargaining dispute

In 2011, there were a series of demonstrations in Wisconsin, involving at its zenith as many as 100,000 protestors opposing the 2011 Wisconsin Act 10, also called the "Wisconsin budget repair bill." The legislation, passed by the Wisconsin Legislature on June 29, 2011, primarily impacted the following areas: collective bargaining, compensation, retirement, health insurance, and sick leave of the state's public sector employees.

These protests became a major driving force of multiple recall elections, including state senators in 2011 and 2012, Governor Scott Walker in 2012 and a contentious Wisconsin Supreme Court election in 2011.

Rape and pregnancy controversies and the "War on Women"

Starting in August 2012, a series of controversies occurred involving comments made by a number of socially conservative Republican candidates regarding issues regarding rape, pregnancy, and abortion, bringing these issues to the forefront. The first most notable was Republican House Representative Todd Akin of Missouri, who was the Republican nominee for a U.S. Senate seat. He stated that pregnancy from rape rarely occurs as a result of what he referred to as "legitimate rape." Akin's comments had a far-reaching political impact, changing a focus of campaigns across the country onto the so-called "War on Women." Another widely covered comment was that of Indiana State Treasurer and U.S. Senate candidate Richard Mourdock, who said that pregnancy from rape was "something that God intended". A number of observers later identified Mourdock's and Akin's comments as a principal factor in their respective election losses. The comments are also credited for having a larger national effect.

Benghazi attack

The major foreign policy controversy during the final weeks of the campaign was the September attack on the American diplomatic mission at Benghazi, Libya by a heavily armed group. Four people were killed, including U.S. Ambassador J. Christopher Stevens, and ten others were injured. This was initially blamed on a series of protests and violent attacks began in response to a YouTube trailer for the controversial film Innocence of Muslims, considered blasphemous by many Muslims. According to critics, the consulate site should have been secured better both before and after the attack. Republicans further criticized the Obama administration's response to the attacks, ranging from accusations that they incorrectly attributed the role of anger over the film instead of suspecting it more as a coordinated attack by a terrorist group like al-Qaeda; to complaints with delays in the administration's investigation.

Federal elections

Presidential election

Democratic incumbent President Barack Obama was re-elected, defeating Republican former Massachusetts Governor Mitt Romney. This was the first presidential election since the 2010 census, which changed the Electoral College vote apportionment.

With the advantage of incumbency, Obama faced no major challengers in the Democratic Party primaries. Several candidates competed in the Republican Party primaries; by late April, Romney, a former Governor of Massachusetts, was declared the presumptive Republican nominee. Among the third party candidates, former Governor of New Mexico Gary Johnson was the Libertarian Party nominee, Jill Stein was the Green Party nominee, former Member of the U.S. House of Representatives from Virginia's 5th congressional district Virgil Goode was the Constitution Party nominee, and former Mayor of Salt Lake City Rocky Anderson was the Justice Party nominee.

Congressional elections

Senate elections

The 33 seats of Class I of the United States Senate were up for election. Democrats were expected to have 23 seats up for election, including 2 independents who caucus with the Democrats, while Republicans were only expected to have 10 seats up for election. The Democrats ended up retaining majority control of the Senate, picking up two net seats. One of the Democratic winners was Wisconsin's Tammy Baldwin, who became the first openly LGBT member of the US Senate.

House of Representatives elections

This was the first congressional election using the congressional districts that were apportioned based on the 2010 census. Elections were held for all 435 seats in the United States House of Representatives. Elections were also held for the delegates from the District of Columbia and five major U.S. territories. Although House Democrats won a plurality of the popular vote (48.8% vs 47.6%), House Republicans were still able to retain a 234 to 201 seat majority.

A special election in Oregon's 1st congressional district was held on January 31 to determine a replacement for David Wu, who resigned in August 2011. Another special election in Arizona's 8th congressional district was held on June 12 to elect the replacement of Gabby Giffords, who resigned in January 2012. The winners of these two special elections (Suzanne Bonamici from Oregon, Ron Barber from Arizona) both ran in attempts to keep their seats.

As a matter of convenience and cost saving, the special election in New Jersey's 10th congressional district and the special election in Michigan's 11th congressional district were held in conjunction with the regularly-scheduled general election on November 6, 2012. New Jersey congressman Donald M. Payne died in March 2012 while Michigan's Thaddeus McCotter resigned in July 2012. In both districts, voters were asked on the November ballot to select two candidates: one to serve the remainder of Payne or McCotter's term, respectively, and the other to serve their respective district's full 2-year term beginning in January 2013.

State and territorial elections

Gubernatorial elections

12 state and two territory governorships were up for election. In addition, Scott Walker of Wisconsin survived a recall election on June 5. Only one state governorship changed hands: In North Carolina, Republican Pat McCrory was elected to replace the retiring Democratic Governor Bev Perdue.

The territorial governorships of American Samoa and Puerto Rico were also up for election.

Other statewide elections
In many states where if the following positions are elective offices, voters will cast votes for candidates for the state executive branch offices of Lieutenant Governor (though some will be voted for on the same ticket as the gubernatorial nominee), Secretary of state, state Treasurer, state Auditor, state Attorney General, state Superintendent of Education, Commissioners of Insurance, Agriculture, or Labor, etc., and state judicial branch offices (seats on state Supreme Courts and, in some states, state appellate courts).

State and territorial legislative elections

Many states across the nation held elections for their state legislatures. 12 chambers shifted party control, with seven turning Democratic while five turned Republican. Democrats won the Colorado House of Representatives, Maine Senate, Maine House of Representatives, Minnesota Senate, Minnesota House of Representatives, New Hampshire House of Representatives, and Oregon House of Representatives that was previously tied. Meanwhile, Republicans won the Wisconsin Senate, Arkansas Senate, Arkansas House of Representatives. The Alaska Senate went from a Democratic-led coalition to Republican control. The Washington Senate went from Democratic to a Republican-led coalition, and the New York State Senate went from a Republican to a Republican-led coalition. 

Republicans had gained many chambers in the 2010 elections, and this was seen as a modest rebalancing. All the Democratic gains came from chambers they had lost after the 2010 elections. The transition in the Wisconsin Senate was notable since it undid a brief period of Democratic control following contentious recall efforts in 2011 and earlier in 2012. The Arkansas chambers had been under Democratic control since the end of the Reconstruction Era.

Puerto Rican status referendum

A referendum regarding the political status of Puerto Rico was held. Puerto Rican voters were asked two questions: First, whether they prefer the status quo of remaining a U.S. unincorporated territory—a majority (54%), rejected the status quo.  The second question asked whether they prefer statehood, independence or free association—a majority (61% of votes cast) supported statehood for Puerto Rico.

However, one-third of all votes cast left the second question blank. Governor-elect Alejandro García Padilla, who had been critical of the process, then sent a message to President Obama, asking him to reject the results because of their ambiguity. On November 8, 2012, Washington, D.C. newspaper The Hill published an article saying that Congress will also likely ignore the results of the referendum due to the circumstances behind the votes.

State and territory initiatives and referendums

Maine, Maryland and Washington approved same sex marriage by popular vote, the first time any states have done so, bringing the number of states that allow same sex marriage from 6 to 9 states. In Minnesota, a proposed constitutional amendment to ban same sex marriage was defeated, the first time such an amendment has not passed.

A measure in Massachusetts resulted in that state becoming the 18th US state to allow medical cannabis. By ballot measure, voters in both Colorado and Washington chose to legalize cannabis outright, the first states to do so, whereas voters in Oregon chose to reject it.

Local elections
Nationwide, cities, counties, school boards, special districts and others held elections in 2012.

Some of the major American cities that held mayoral elections in 2012 included:
 Carson City, Nevada: Incumbent Bob Crowell won re-election.
 Honolulu, Hawaii: Incumbent Peter Carlisle was defeated in the non-partisan blanket primary in August. Former state representative Kirk Caldwell then defeated former Hawaii Governor Ben Cayetano in the runoff.
 Milwaukee, Wisconsin: Incumbent Tom Barrett won re-election.
 Orlando, Florida: Incumbent Buddy Dyer won re-election.
 Portland, Oregon: Incumbent Sam Adams did not seek another term. Charlie Hales was elected as his replacement.
 San Diego, California: Incumbent Jerry Sanders was term-limited out of office. Former congressman Bob Filner was elected to replace him, defeating city councilman Carl DeMaio.

Election financing
The 2012 election cycle was the first to be impacted by the Supreme Court's Citizens United decision, which prohibited the government from restricting independent political expenditures by corporations and unions.  The projected cost of the 2012 federal election races is estimated to be over 5.8 billion dollars,  with approximately $1 billion of that coming from "outside" groups (groups not directly controlled by the candidate's campaign or officially controlled by the party). During the elections there was much spending by the lobbies, particularly the fossil fuels lobby.

Table of federal and state results

Bold indicates a change in control. Note that not all states held gubernatorial, state legislative, and United States Senate elections in 2012.

Notes

References

Further reading
 Barone, Michael, et al.,  The Almanac of American Politics 2014 (2013), detailed coverage of every election for Congress and governor excerpt
 Jacobson, Gary C. "How the Economy and Partisanship Shaped the 2012 Presidential and Congressional Elections." Political Science Quarterly (2013) 128#1 pp: 1-38. online
 Nelson, Michael, ed. The Elections of 2012 (2013)  excerpt and text search; topical essays by experts

External links

 liveuselections.info - United States Elections, 2012
 
 

 
2012